Nicholas "Nic" White (born 8 January 1974) is a South African former racing cyclist.

White won the UCI Africa Tour series in 2007/8 season and the African Road Championship in Cameroon in 2007.

In 2008 White competed in the Absa Cape Epic with partner Anke Erlank, placing 1st in the Mixed Category.

Major results

1998
 3rd National Time Trial Championships
1999
 1st Pick n Pay Amashovashova National Classic
 3rd Overall Toer Report
1st Stage 2
 3rd Overall Giro del Capo
2000
 1st  Overall Giro del Capo
1st Stage 6
 1st Stage 1 Tour of South China Sea
2001
 2nd Overall FBD Insurance Rás
1st Stage 7
 2nd Overall Giro del Capo
1st Stage 5
 3rd National Time Trial Championships
2002
 1st  Overall Tour of South China Sea
1st Stage 1
 1st Stage 5 Tour de Serbie
 2nd National Time Trial Championships
2003
 3rd National Time Trial Championships
2004
 1st  Overall Mi-Août en Bretagne
 1st Stage 6 Ruban Granitier Breton
 3rd National Time Trial Championships
 3rd National Road Race Championships
 5th Overall Tour de Langkawi
2006
 2nd National Time Trial Championships
2007
 African Road Championships
1st Road race
1st Time trial
 1st  Overall Tour du Maroc
1st Stage 1a
 3rd National Time Trial Championships
 8th Overall Giro del Capo
2008
 1st Overall UCI Africa Tour
 2nd Time trial, African Road Championships
 2nd National Time Trial Championships
 3rd Intaka Tech Worlds View Challenge 1
 4th Overall La Tropicale Amissa Bongo
 6th Overall Tour du Maroc
1st Stage 9
 9th Overall Giro del Capo
2010
 2nd National Road Race Championships
 2nd Overall Tour of Thailand
 6th H. H. Vice-President's Cup

References

External links
 
 http://www.teammedscheme.co.za//

Living people
1974 births
South African male cyclists
20th-century South African people
21st-century South African people